Angelo Vanzin (8 February 1932 – 22 May 2018) was an Italian competition rower and Olympic champion. He won a gold medal in the coxed four event at the 1956 Summer Olympics in Melbourne, together with Romano Sgheiz, Alberto Winkler, Franco Trincavelli and Ivo Stefanoni.

See also
Italy at the 1956 Summer Olympics

References

External links
 
 

1932 births
2018 deaths
Italian male rowers
Olympic rowers of Italy
Olympic gold medalists for Italy
Rowers at the 1956 Summer Olympics
Olympic medalists in rowing
Medalists at the 1956 Summer Olympics
European Rowing Championships medalists
People from Lierna